Love in 40 Days is a Philippine fantasy romantic comedy television series broadcast by Kapamilya Channel. Directed by Emmanuel Palo and Jojo Saguin, it stars Loisa Andalio and Ronnie Alonte. The series premiered on the network's Primetime Bida evening block, Jeepney TV, A2Z Primetime, TV5's Todo Max Primetime Singko and worldwide via The Filipino Channel from May 30 to October 28, 2022 at the late-night primetime slot replacing Meow, The Secret Boy and was replaced by Ever Night: War of Brilliant Splendours.

Plot
Jane (Loisa Andalio) is a successful insurance agent who provides for her family's needs. Her perfect life ends when she is killed in a car accident and becomes a ghost. Jane arrives in Evergreen Mansion, a transitory place in the afterlife where souls settle within 40 days before they can cross over to either heaven or hell. She meets Edward (Ronnie Alonte), a musician and son of a funeral home director, whose third eye was opened due to an accident and he begins seeing ghosts.

As Jane slowly accepts her fate, her plans are thwarted by Edward who wants to expel all the ghosts in the mansion to build a resto-bar for himself and his band. Jane refuses to let Edward succeed by befriending him in an attempt to convince him not to remodel the mansion. However, things start to get complicated when Edward realizes Jane is a ghost, and they gradually develop feelings for each other, all while their respective families' problems clash and the people around them try to figure out the connection between the two.

Cast and characters
Main cast
 Loisa Andalio as Jane Marasigan
 Ronnie Alonte as Edward Montemayor / Nathaniel Rosal

Supporting cast
 Leo Martinez as Patricio Guzman
 Janice de Belen as Ofelia Abanilla / Jocelyn "Josie" Rosal
 Mylene Dizon as Andrea Buena-Montemayor / Maria Cristina Ocampo
 Lotlot de Leon as Diana Perez
 Maria Isabel Lopez as Roberta "Berta" Ignacio
 William Lorenzo as Jesus "Jessie" Marasigan
 Ana Abad Santos as Susan Agoncillo-Marasigan
 Bart Guingona as Robert Montemayor
 Ahron Villena as Marco Peñaflor
 Chie Filomeno as Eileen Montemayor
 Trina "Hopia" Legaspi as Alice Samonte
 Vaughn Piczon as Elias Soliman
 Raven Molina as Robbie Montano
 Roy Victor Padilla as Derek
 Renshi de Guzman as Kokoy Ignacio
 Josh de Guzman as Ramon "Monmon" Marasigan
 Andi Abaya as Celine de Vera
 Kobie Brown as Brock Reynolds
 Benedix Ramos as George Casimiro
 Zabel Lamberth as Valerie Marasigan

Guest cast
 Aleck Bovick as Sylvia Marasigan
 Allan Paule as Anton Velasquez
 Angie Castrence as Karina Guzman
 Chard Ocampo as Pol
 Ian Pangilinan as Jeff
 Justine Rivera as Kyle
 Kaila Estrada as young Ofelia
 Miggy Campbell as young Anton
 Mary Joy Apostol as young Andrea
 Zach Castañeda as young Robert
 Bea Borres as young Karina
 Hannah Lopez Vito as young Valerie

Production

Filming 
Filming began in late January 2022.

Casting 
Casting for the drama include former housemates from Pinoy Big Brother: Andi Abaya and Kobie Brown from Connect, and Chie Filomeno and Benedix Ramos from Kumunity Season 10. Filomeno's participation was confirmed during a script reading session in November 2021.

Marketing 
A teaser was released on April 26, 2022, via ABS-CBN Entertainment's YouTube channel. The full trailer was released on May 5, 2022.

Music 

On June 3, 2022, Star Music through its sub-label StarPop released the official soundtrack of the series. Most tracks are composed by Jonathan Manalo and Rox Santos, with BoybandPH's Ford Valencia performing a rendition of Say Alonzo and Sam Milby's 2005 original song "Magmahal Muli", and Jeremy G performing both solo and duet (with Angela Ken) renditions of Daniel Padilla's "Sabay Natin".

Episodes

Notes

References

External links
 

ABS-CBN original programming
Philippine romantic comedy television series
Philippine fantasy television series
2022 Philippine television series debuts
2022 Philippine television series endings
Television series by Dreamscape Entertainment Television
Television shows set in the Philippines
Filipino-language television shows
Television series about ghosts